Petra Polanc (born 17 August 2000) is a Slovenian badminton player. She participated at the 2018 Summer Youth Olympics in Buenos Aires, Argentina.

Achievements

BWF International Challenge/Series (2 titles, 4 runners-up) 
Women's singles

Women's doubles

Mixed doubles

  BWF International Challenge tournament
  BWF International Series tournament
  BWF Future Series tournament

References

External links 
 

2000 births
Living people
Slovenian female badminton players
Badminton players at the 2018 Summer Youth Olympics
Competitors at the 2022 Mediterranean Games
Mediterranean Games competitors for Slovenia
21st-century Slovenian women